Toivakka is a municipality of Finland. It is located in the Central Finland region, near Jyväskylä. The municipality has a population of 
The municipality is unilingually Finnish.

The sower pictured in the coat of arms of Toivakka refers to agriculture but also to hope for the future. The coat of arms was designed by Gustaf von Numers and was confirmed for use on April 23, 1957.

Geography
Neighbouring municipalities are Hankasalmi, Joutsa, Jyväskylä, Kangasniemi, Laukaa and Muurame.

There are altogether 82 lakes in Toivakka. The biggest lakes are Päijänne, Maunonen and Palosenjärvi.

The largest forest tree and the deepest inland water point in Finland are both located in Toivakka.

History 
A farm named Toivakka has existed since 1540. Its name is derived from the Savonian surname Toivakainen. It was a part of the village of Leppävesi in Laukaa, which was included in the Rautalampi parish after its establishment in 1561. Laukaa became an independent parish in 1628 and Toivakka remained a part of it until 1871, when it was transferred to Jyväskylän maalaiskunta, which was split off from Laukaa a few years earlier in 1868. Toivakka became a separate parish in 1909 and a municipality in 1910.

Twinnings
 Kambja Parish, Estonia

Gallery

References

External links

Municipality of Toivakka – Official website 

 
Populated places established in 1910